Helena Thopia ( 1388–1403) was an Albanian princess of the Thopia family who held the Krujë region as sovereign lady for two terms; 1388-1392 and 1394–1403.

Life
Princess Helena Thopia was the eldest daughter of Karl Thopia and Voisava Balsha. Her first marriage was to Marco Barbarigo, a Venetian nobleman. After the death of her father, in 1388, she inherited the castle of Krujë and the surrounding region. In 1392 as a result of the hostilities between her husband and the Venetian forces, her half-brother, Niketa Thopia, a Venice loyal, attacked the city of Krujë and forced them to find refuge among the Balšić family.

In 1394, Konstantin Balšić, who was appointed by the Ottomans to govern Krujë, married her. Konstantin ruled as an Ottoman vassal and was killed in 1402. In 1403 Niketa Thopia captured the castle from Helena. After Konstantin's death Helena and their son Stefan first went to Venice and then lived with her sister Maria.

Issue
She married Marco Barbarigo, and then Konstantin Balšić in 1394. She had a son with Konstantin, Stefan Maramonte.

See also

References

Helena
15th-century Albanian people
14th-century rulers in Europe
14th-century women rulers
Balšić noble family
Medieval Albanian nobility